Al Brooks may refer to:
Albert Brooks (born 1947), American actor
Alfred Brooks (dancer) (1916–2005), American modern dancer and dance company founder